Sugar City is a city in Madison County, Idaho, United States. The population was 1,715 at the 2020 census, up from 1,514 in 2010. It is part of the Rexburg Micropolitan Statistical Area.

History
Sugar City was a company town for the Fremont County Sugar Company, which was part of the Utah-Idaho Sugar Company, supporting a sugar beet processing factory built in 1903–1904. Since it was created to support the factory, construction workers and early factory families were housed in tents, leading to the nickname "Rag Town". By 1904, the town consisted of 35 houses, two stores, a hotel, an opera house, several boarding houses, two lumber yards, a meat market, and a schoolhouse. The first Mormon ward was the Sugar City Ward, with Bishop Mark Austin. One of his counselors was James Malone, a construction engineer for E. H. Dyer, who was not a Mormon.

In early years the factory had a labor shortage, leading to a local community of Nikkei—Japanese migrants and their descendants.

The city was flooded by the waters of the Teton Dam collapse on June 5, 1976.

Geography
U.S. Route 20 runs along the western edge of the city, leading southwest  to Rexburg and northeast  to St. Anthony. Idaho State Highway 33 runs through the center of Sugar City, leading southwest  to the center of Rexburg and east the same distance to Teton.

Demographics

2010 census
As of the census there are 2,616 people, 419 households, and 373 families residing in the city. The racial makeup of the city was 91.3% White, 0.1% African American, 0.4% Native American, 0.3% Asian, 6.7% from other races, and 1.2% from two or more races. Hispanic or Latino of any race were 10.9% of the population.

There were 419 households, of which 52.5% had children under the age of 18 living with them, 75.7% were married couples living together, 11.0% had a female householder with no husband present, 2.4% had a male householder with no wife present, and 11.0% were non-families. 10.3% of all households were made up of individuals, and 5.5% had someone living alone who was 65 years of age or older. The average household size was 3.61 and the average family size was 3.87.

The median age in the city was 24.8 years. 39.5% of residents were under the age of 18; 10.7% were between the ages of 18 and 24; 22% were from 25 to 44; 18.7% were from 45 to 64; and 9% were 65 years of age or older. The gender makeup of the city was 48.4% male and 51.6% female.

2000 census
As of the census of 2000, there were 1,242 people, 326 households, and 292 families residing in the city. The racial makeup of the city was 92.83% White, 0.16% African American, 0.16% Native American, 0.81% Asian, 4.51% from other races, and 1.53% from two or more races. Hispanic or Latino of any race were 8.29% of the population.

There were 326 households, out of which 57.4% had children under the age of 18 living with them, 80.7% were married couples living together, 7.7% had a female householder with no husband present, and 10.4% were non-families. 8.9% of all households were made up of individuals, and 3.1% had someone living alone who was 65 years of age or older. The average household size was 3.81 and the average family size was 4.08.

In the city, the population was spread out, with 40.6% under the age of 18, 10.9% from 18 to 24, 22.3% from 25 to 44, 19.5% from 45 to 64, and 6.8% who were 65 years of age or older. The median age was 24 years. For every 100 females, there were 101.6 males. For every 100 females age 18 and over, there were 95.8 males.

The median income for a household in the city was $45,500, and the median income for a family was $46,333. Males had a median income of $30,139 versus $22,917 for females. The per capita income for the city was $12,737. About 6.1% of families and 7.8% of the population were below the poverty line, including 10.5% of those under age 18 and 2.3% of those age 65 or over.

Education

Sugar-Salem High School is a small high school located in the town of Sugar City and is part of the Sugar-Salem School District. The district takes in students from the surrounding area, from the community referred to locally as Plano on the west to beyond the town of Newdale on the east. On the north it borders Fremont County, following the Henry's fork of the Snake River, and on the south it borders with Madison School District and the city of Rexburg.

Notable people
 Harold G. Hillam, Emeritus General Authority of the Church of Jesus Christ of Latter-day Saints; former member of the Presidency of the Seventy
 Thomas C. Neibaur, first Mormon Medal of Honor recipient and first born in Idaho 
 Laurel Thatcher Ulrich, Pulitzer-prize winning author of A Midwife's Tale

See also
 List of cities in Idaho
 Teton Dam

References

External links

 
 Rexburg Area Chamber of Commerce

Cities in Madison County, Idaho
Cities in Idaho
Rexburg, Idaho micropolitan area
Company towns in Idaho
Populated places established in 1903
1903 establishments in Idaho